Čertovica is a mountain pass in the Low Tatras mountain range in Slovakia. It connects regions of Liptov and Horehronie. With  AMSL, it is the highest paved mountain pass in Slovakia. It is open all year round, however, it can be rarely closed during the winter because of the severe weather conditions. The pass was daily crossed by more than 2000 vehicles as of 2005. On the pass is also situated a minor ski resort and a chalet offering accommodation. The pass is also an important starting or endpoint for many hiking trips because it lies in the middle of the range and is close to some of the range's popular summits as the highest Ďumbier and third-highest Chopok.

See also
 List of highest paved roads in Europe
 List of mountain passes

References 

Mountain passes of Slovakia